Westgate-in-Weardale railway station served the village of Westgate, County Durham, England, from 1895 to 1965 on the Weardale Railway.

History 
The station opened on 21 October 1895 by the North Eastern Railway. It was situated on the east side of a minor road. It closed to passengers in June 1953 but remained open for goods. When  closed on 1 November 1965, it was converted to a public delivery siding. It closed to goods on 1 July 1968.

References

External links 

North Eastern Railway (UK)
Railway stations in Great Britain opened in 1895
Railway stations in Great Britain closed in 1965
Disused railway stations in County Durham
Stanhope, County Durham